Deep Voll Brook, also known as Deep Brook (USGS captioned name), is a tributary of Goffle Brook and part of the Passaic River watershed.  The brook drains part of the eastern flank of First Watchung Mountain, cutting through portions of Bergen and Passaic county in New Jersey.  Heading up the brook from its junction with Goffle Brook, one encounters the towns of Hawthorne and Wyckoff.

History
Deep Voll Brook's name is derived from the Dutch Diepte Voll, which literally translates to Deep Fall.  The name is accurate, considering the brook features numerous waterfalls and steep slopes.  Prior to the 20th century, the brook was known as Cold Brook, as well as Muksukemuk, its Lenape name.  In the modern era, locals in Hawthorne and Wyckoff have simply come to call the brook and its surrounding terrain The Ravine.

Local interest in The Ravine has spiked in recent years as development has threatened its existence.  Many, particularly in Wyckoff, have pushed to see the upland terrain around Deep Voll Brook's headwaters preserved as open space.

See also
List of New Jersey rivers

References

External links
TopoQuest map depicting Deep Voll Brook (Deep Brook) in Hawthorne and Wyckoff
Opinion article citing the effect of development on the brook and the impact on Hawthorne.
2007 Water Resources Data brief on USGS's Deep Voll Brook stream gage

Rivers of Bergen County, New Jersey
Rivers of Passaic County, New Jersey
Tributaries of the Passaic River
Rivers of New Jersey